Liu Pi may refer to:

Liu Pi, Prince of Wu (216–154 BC), leader of the Rebellion of the Seven States in the Western Han dynasty
Liu Pi (劉辟) (died 201), a leader of the Yellow Turban Rebellion in the Eastern Han dynasty
Liu Pi (official) (died 806), an official during the Tang dynasty